The Days of Gold Tour presented by Discover Boating is the second headlining tour by American country music singer Jake Owen. The tour began on March 20, 2014, in Brookings, South Dakota, and ended on October 25, 2014, in Owen's hometown of Vero Beach, Florida.

Background
The Days of Gold Tour is in support of Owen's fourth studio album, Days of Gold. Opening acts for the tour will be the Eli Young Band, Parmalee, Thomas Rhett, Frankie Ballard and The Cadillac Three. Owen went on tour with his wife, Lacey, and daughter.

Opening acts
Frankie Ballard (select dates)
The Cadillac Three (select dates)
Parmalee (select dates)
Thomas Rhett (select dates)
Eli Young Band (select dates)

Setlist
"Days of Gold"
"Anywhere with You"
"Beachin'"
"Heaven"
"Eight Second Ride"
"Drivin' All Night"
"The One That Got Away"
Medley; "Friends in Low Places"/"Chattahoochee"/"Ice Ice Baby" (Garth Brooks/Alan Jackson/Vanilla Ice covers)
"Alone with You"
"Tipsy"
"Don't Think I Could Beg"
"Yee Ha"
"Barefoot Blue Jean Night"

Tour dates

Festivals and fairs
  This concert was a part of the Virginia Beach Patriot Festival.
  This concert was a part of The Country Festival.
  This concert was a part of the Taste of Country Festival.
  These concerts were part of Country Jam USA.
  This concert was a part of Bands in the Backyard.
  This concert was a part of the Greeley Stampede.
  This concert was a part of the WGNA Country Fest.
  This concert was a part of the Porter County Fair'.
  This concert was a part of Firefest  This concert was a part of the Montana State Fair.
  This concert was a part of Sunfest Country.
  This concert was a part of the Oregon Jamboree.
  This concert was a part of the Iowa State Fair.
  This concert was a part of the Missouri State Fair.
  This concert was a part of the Illinois State Fair.
  This concert was a part of the KBEQ Yallapalloza at Starlight Theatre.
  This concert was a part of WCOL Country in the Capitol.
  These concerts were part of WPOC's "Saturday in the Country" and "Sunday in the Country"'''.

Box office score data

References

External links

2014 concert tours
Jake Owen concert tours